Telekinesis! is the eponymous debut studio album by the alternative rock band Telekinesis. Recorded in September 2008, the album was produced, mixed, and engineered with the help of Chris Walla (guitarist for Death Cab For Cutie), recording one song per day on analog tape. The album was released on Merge Records on April 7, 2009.

Track listing
"Rust" – 2:06
"Coast of Carolina" – 3:32
"Tokyo" – 2:54
"Look to the East" – 3:14
"Awkward Kisser" – 1:45
"Foreign Room" – 3:30
"Great Lakes" – 2:54
"Imaginary Friend" – 2:54
"All of a Sudden" – 3:43
"Calling All Doctors" – 3:03
"I Saw Lightning" – 2:12

Personnel
Michael Benjamin Lerner – drums, guitar, vocals
Touring band
Chris Staples – guitar
David Broecker – electric guitar, acoustic guitar, bass guitar
Jonie Broecker – bass guitar, keyboards

References

External links
Merge Records - Telekinesis
Telekinesis on Myspace

2009 debut albums
Merge Records albums